Gemayel (romanized: al-Jumayyil) is the name of a prominent Lebanese Maronite Christian family based in Bikfaya, Lebanon.

History
The family is mentioned in bureaucratic records as among the inhabitants of Bikfaya as early as the 16th century. Between that time until the 18th century they were the sheikhs of the village. In 1642 Sheikh Abu Aoun was the joint governor of the subdistrict of Bsharri alongside the Druze chief Zayn al-Din of the Sawwaf family.

Notable members
 Philip Gemayel, Maronite patriarch from 1795 to 1796
 Pierre Gemayel (1905–1984), Lebanese political leader and founder of the Kataeb Party
 Geneviève Gemayel (1908–2003), Lebanese political figure, pilot and artist
 Maurice Gemayel (1910–1970), Member of Parliament, brother-in-law of Pierre Gemayel
 Amine Gemayel (born 1942), President of Lebanon from 1982 to 1988, son of Pierre Gemayel
 Bachir Gemayel (1947–1982), son of Pierre Gemayel and  Lebanese military commander, politician and president-elect
 Joyce Gemayel, former First Lady of Lebanon, Amine Gemayel's wife
 Pierre Amine Gemayel (1972–2006), Lebanese politician, government minister, assassinated son of President Amine Gemayel
 Samy Gemayel (born 1980), Lebanese politician, son of Amine Gemayel and brother of Pierre Amine Gemayel
 Solange Gemayel (born 1949), former First Lady of Lebanon, widow of former President-elect Bachir Gemayel and was a Member of Parliament from 2005 to 2009
 Nadim Gemayel (born 1982), Lebanese politician, son of Bachir Gemayel
 Boutros Gemayel, Archbishop of Cipro, Cyprus

See also 

 List of political families in Lebanon
 Maronite politics

References

Bibliography

 
Roman Catholic families